Alamogordo may refer to:

Education
 Alamogordo High School, a high school in Otero County, New Mexico
 Alamogordo Public Schools, the school system for an area of Otero County
 New Mexico State University Alamogordo, a 2-year community college

Military
 Alamogordo Air Force Base, the name of Holloman Air Force Base before 1948
 Alamogordo Army Air Field, or Holloman Air Force Base, home of the 49th Wing of the Air Combat Command
 Alamogordo Guided Missile Test Base, part of the White Sands Missile Range in Southern New Mexico

Other
 Alamogordo Daily News, founded in 1898
 Alamogordo, NM Micropolitan Statistical Area, geographically the same as Otero County, New Mexico
 Alamogordo, NM μSA, a micropolitan area that is geographically the same as Otero County, New Mexico

See also
 USS Alamogordo (ARDM-2)